Kataria gloriosa is a flatworm in the family Stylochidae. It is the only species in the genus Kataria.

References

Turbellaria